The Wright Vertical 4 was an American aircraft engine built by the Wright brothers in the very early years of powered flight. It was a liquid-cooled piston engine with four inline cylinders, mounted vertically. (Earlier Wright engines were mounted horizontally.) Developed by Orville Wright in 1906, the Vertical 4 was produced by the Wright Company until 1912 and was the most numerous engine they manufactured. Around a hundred Vertical 4 engines were built, according to a Wright test foreman.

The Vertical 4 powered most Wright aircraft during this period, including the Model A and Model B and variants built for the U.S. Army and Navy.

This engine was also built under license by Bariquand et Marre in France and by Neue Automobil-Gesellschaft in Germany.

Applications
 Wright Model A
 Wright Model B
 Wright Model R

Engines on display
Wright Vertical 4 engines can be seen on display in the following museums, among others:
 National Air and Space Museum, Washington, D.C.
 Steven F. Udvar-Hazy Center, Chantilly, Virginia
 Wright Brothers Aviation Center in Carillon Historical Park, Dayton, Ohio
 Hiller Aviation Museum, San Carlos, California
 New England Air Museum, Windsor Locks, Connecticut
 Museum of Science and Industry, Chicago, Illinois
 National Museum of Flight, East Fortune, Scotland

Specifications

References

This article contains material that originally came from the placard at the Steven F. Udvar-Hazy Center.

Bibliography

External links

 (Former keepsake of Orville Wright, inventory A19620037000.)
 (U.S. Navy Wright Model B engine, inventory A19520108000.)
 Further detail on the engine's construction and history, and pointers to references.

1900s aircraft piston engines
Vertical 4